Georgia Gee (born 28 October 1999) is an Australian rules footballer playing for the Essendon Football Club in the AFL Women's (AFLW). Gee was drafted by Carlton with their first selection and twelfth overall in the 2017 AFL Women's draft. She made her debut in the eight-point win against  at Ikon Park in the opening round of the 2018 season.
In April 2022, it was confirmed Gee had committed to Essendon Football Club, commencing in AFL Women's season seven.

AFLW career
 selected Gee with their first pick, number twelve overall, in the 2017 AFL Women's draft. She made her debut against  in round 1 and kicked her first career goal against  in round 6. She played eleven games for the club in 2018 — six in the AFLW and five in the VFLW.

In 2019, Gee nearly doubled her output from her first season and averaged more than 10 disposals per game. She put in a career-best performance in round 3 against , recording 14 disposals, 6 tackles and a goal. In April 2019, she signed a two-year contract extension with the club. She played eleven games for Carlton in 2019 — eight in the AFLW and three in the VFLW.

In 2020, Gee finished the AFLW season with eight goals (converting at 100 per cent) in seven games, averaging 10 disposals a game. Her best performance came in round 3 against the Western Bulldogs, a game in which she kicked three goals and laid six tackles. She was voted as the final MVP of the Week for 2020 after kicking three goals, laying two tackles and collecting 12 touches and three inside 50s in a 29-point win over Brisbane. She was also voted into the inaugural AFLW 22under22 team and included in the 2020 AFL Women's All-Australian team of 40. In August 2020, she signed a one-year contract extension, committing to the club until at least the end of 2022.

Statistics
Statistics are correct to the end of Round 3 of the 2021 season. 

|- style="background:#EAEAEA"
| scope="row" text-align:center | 2018
| 
| 19 || 6 || 1 || 2 || 28 || 6 || 34 || 3 || 15 || 0.2 || 0.3 || 4.7 || 1.0 || 5.7 || 0.5 || 2.5 || 0
|- 
| scope="row" text-align:center | 2019
| 
| 19 || 8 || 1 || 0 || 60 || 26 || 86 || 12 || 27 || 0.1 || 0.0 || 7.5 || 3.3 || 10.8 || 1.5 || 3.4 || 0
|- style="background:#EAEAEA"
| scope="row" text-align:center | 2020
| 
| 19 || 7 || 8 || 0 || 38 || 33 || 71 || 8 || 25 || 1.1 || 0.0 || 5.4 || 4.7 || 10.1 || 1.1 || 3.6 || 0
|-
! scope="row" style="text-align:center" | 2021
||
| 19 || 3 || 1 || 2 || 21 || 13 || 34 || 5 || 12 || 0.3 || 0.5 || 7.0 || 4.3 || 11.3 || 1.7 || 4.0 || 
|- class="sortbottom"
! colspan=3 | Career
! 24
! 11 
! 4
! 147 
! 78
! 225
! 28	 
! 79 
! 0.5 
! 0.2
! 6.1
! 3.3  
! 9.4
! 1.2
! 3.3
! 0
|}

Honours 
 AFL Women's Rising Star nominee: 2019
 22under22 team: 2020

References

External links 

1999 births
Living people
Carlton Football Club (AFLW) players
Australian rules footballers from Victoria (Australia)
Dandenong Stingrays players (NAB League Girls)
Essendon Football Club (AFLW) players